The following is a partial list of the "D" codes for Medical Subject Headings (MeSH), as defined by the United States National Library of Medicine (NLM).

This list covers carrier proteins. For other protein-related codes, see List of MeSH codes (D12.776).

Codes before these are found at List of MeSH codes (D12.776.124). Codes following these are found at List of MeSH codes (D12.776) § MeSH D12.776.167. For other MeSH codes, see List of MeSH codes.

The source for this content is the set of 2006 MeSH Trees from the NLM.

– carrier proteins

– acyl carrier protein

– adaptor proteins, signal transducing

– caveolin 1

– cortactin

– crk-associated substrate protein

– grb2 adaptor protein

– grb7 adaptor protein

– grb10 adaptor protein

– interferon regulatory factors
 – interferon regulatory factor-1
 – interferon regulatory factor-2
 – interferon regulatory factor-3
 – interferon regulatory factor-7
 – interferon-stimulated gene factor 3, gamma subunit

– interferon-stimulated gene factor 3
 – interferon-stimulated gene factor 3, alpha subunit
 – stat1 transcription factor
 – stat2 transcription factor
 – interferon-stimulated gene factor 3, gamma subunit

– pii nitrogen regulatory proteins

– paxillin

– protein inhibitors of activated stat

– 14-3-3 proteins

– proto-oncogene proteins c-crk

– proto-oncogene proteins c-vav

– smad proteins
 – smad proteins, inhibitory
 – smad6 protein
 – smad7 protein
 – smad proteins, receptor-regulated
 – smad1 protein
 – smad2 protein
 – smad3 protein
 – smad5 protein
 – smad8 protein
 – smad4 protein

– stat transcription factors
 – stat1 transcription factor
 – stat2 transcription factor
 – stat3 transcription factor
 – stat4 transcription factor
 – stat5 transcription factor
 – stat6 transcription factor

– suppressor of cytokine signaling proteins

– tumor necrosis factor receptor-associated peptides and proteins
 – tnf receptor-associated factor 1
 – tnf receptor-associated factor 2
 – tnf receptor-associated factor 3
 – tnf receptor-associated factor 5
 – tnf receptor-associated factor 6

– androgen-binding protein

– calcium-binding proteins

– annexins
 – annexin a1
 – annexin a2
 – Annexin A3
 – annexin a4
 – annexin a5
 – annexin a6
 – annexin a7

– calcium-binding protein, vitamin d-dependent

– calsequestrin

– intracellular calcium-sensing proteins
 – calmodulin
 – calnexin
 – calreticulin
 – gelsolin
 – neuronal calcium-sensor proteins
 – guanylate cyclase-activating proteins
 – hippocalcin
 – Kv channel-interacting proteins
 – neurocalcin
 – recoverin

– myosin light chains

– osteocalcin

– osteonectin

– s100 proteins
 – leukocyte l1 antigen complex
 – calgranulin a
 – calgranulin b

– synaptotagmins
 – synaptotagmin i
 – synaptotagmin ii

– troponin c

– calmodulin-binding proteins

– neurogranin

– ceruloplasmin

– fatty acid-binding proteins

– light-harvesting protein complexes

– f-box proteins

– beta-transducin repeat-containing proteins

– follistatin

– follistatin-related proteins

– gtp-binding proteins

– gtp phosphohydrolase-linked elongation factors
 – peptide elongation factor g
 – peptide elongation factor tu
 – peptide elongation factor 1
 – peptide elongation factor 2

– heterotrimeric gtp-binding proteins
 – gtp-binding protein alpha subunits
 – gtp-binding protein alpha subunits, g12-g13
 – gtp-binding protein alpha subunits, gi-go
 – gtp-binding protein alpha subunit, gi2
 – gtp-binding protein alpha subunits, gq-g11
 – gtp-binding protein alpha subunits, gs
 – gtp-binding protein beta subunits
 – gtp-binding protein gamma subunits
 – transducin

– monomeric gtp-binding proteins
 – adp-ribosylation factors
 – adp-ribosylation factor 1
 – rab gtp-binding proteins
 – rab1 gtp-binding proteins
 – rab2 gtp-binding protein
 – rab3 gtp-binding proteins
 – rab3a gtp-binding protein
 – rab4 gtp-binding proteins
 – rab5 gtp-binding proteins
 – ral gtp-binding proteins
 – ran gtp-binding protein
 – rap gtp-binding proteins
 – rap1 gtp-binding proteins
 – ras proteins
 – oncogene protein p21(ras)
 – proto-oncogene proteins p21(ras)
 – rho gtp-binding proteins
 – cdc42 gtp-binding protein
 – cdc42 gtp-binding protein, saccharomyces cerevisiae
 – rac gtp-binding proteins
 – rac1 gtp-binding protein
 – rhoa gtp-binding protein
 – rhob gtp-binding protein

– insulin-like growth factor binding proteins

– insulin-like growth factor binding protein 1

– insulin-like growth factor binding protein 2

– insulin-like growth factor binding protein 3

– insulin-like growth factor binding protein 4

– insulin-like growth factor binding protein 5

– insulin-like growth factor binding protein 6

– iron-binding proteins

– ferritin
 – apoferritin

– lactoferrin

– nonheme iron proteins
 – hemerythrin
 – iron-sulfur proteins
 – adrenodoxin
 – ferredoxin-nitrite reductase
 – ferredoxins
 – molybdoferredoxin
 – rubredoxins
 – iron regulatory protein 1
 – iron regulatory protein 2
 – electron transport complex i
 – nadh dehydrogenase
 – electron transport complex ii
 – succinate dehydrogenase
 – electron transport complex iii
 – nitrate reductase (nad(p)h)
 – nitrate reductase (nadph)

– transferrin

– lymphocyte antigen 96

– membrane transport proteins

– atp-binding cassette transporters
 – multidrug resistance-associated proteins
 – p-glycoproteins
 – p-glycoprotein

– amino acid transport systems
 – amino acid transport systems, acidic
 – amino acid transport system x-ag
 – glutamate plasma membrane transport proteins
 – excitatory amino acid transporter 1
 – excitatory amino acid transporter 2
 – excitatory amino acid transporter 3
 – excitatory amino acid transporter 4
 – excitatory amino acid transporter 5
 – amino acid transport systems, basic
 – amino acid transport system y+
 – cationic amino acid transporter 1
 – cationic amino acid transporter 2
 – amino acid transport system y+l
 – antigens, cd98
 – antigens, cd98 heavy chain
 – antigens, cd98 light chains
 – amino acid transport systems, neutral
 – amino acid transport system a
 – amino acid transport system asc
 – amino acid transport system l
 – antigens, cd98
 – antigens, cd98 heavy chain
 – antigens, cd98 light chains
 – large neutral amino acid-transporter 1

– fatty acid transport proteins
 – antigens, cd36

– ion channels
 – calcium channels
 – calcium channels, l-type
 – calcium channels, n-type
 – calcium channels, p-type
 – calcium channels, q-type
 – calcium channels, r-type
 – calcium channels, t-type
 – ryanodine receptor calcium release channel
 – trpp cation channels
 – chloride channels
 – cystic fibrosis transmembrane conductance regulator
 – porins
 – aquaporins
 – aquaglyceroporins
 – aquaporin 3
 – aquaporin 6
 – aquaporin 1
 – aquaporin 2
 – aquaporin 4
 – aquaporin 5
 – voltage-dependent anion channels
 – voltage-dependent anion channel 1
 – voltage-dependent anion channel 2
 – potassium channels
 – potassium channels, calcium-activated
 – intermediate-conductance calcium-activated potassium channels
 – large-conductance calcium-activated potassium channels
 – large-conductance calcium-activated potassium channel alpha subunits
 – large-conductance calcium-activated potassium channel beta subunits
 – small-conductance calcium-activated potassium channels
 – potassium channels, inwardly rectifying
 – g protein-coupled inwardly-rectifying potassium channels
 – potassium channels, tandem pore domain
 – potassium channels, voltage-gated
 – delayed rectifier potassium channels
 – kcnq potassium channels
 – kcnq1 potassium channel
 – kcnq2 potassium channel
 – kcnq3 potassium channel
 – kv1.5 potassium channel
 – shab potassium channels
 – ether-a-go-go potassium channels
 – shaker superfamily of potassium channels
 – kv1.1 potassium channel
 – kv1.2 potassium channel
 – kv1.3 potassium channel
 – kv1.4 potassium channel
 – kv1.5 potassium channel
 – kv1.6 potassium channel
 – shab potassium channels
 – shal potassium channels
 – shaw potassium channels
 – sodium channels
 – transient receptor potential channels
 – trpc cation channels
 – trpm cation channels
 – trpp cation channels
 – trpv cation channels

– ion pumps
 – anion transport proteins
 – halorhodopsins
 – organic anion transporters
 – dicarboxylic acid transporters
 – monocarboxylic acid transporters
 – organic anion transporters, atp-dependent
 – multidrug resistance-associated proteins
 – p-glycoprotein
 – p-glycoproteins
 – organic anion transporters, sodium-dependent
 – organic anion transporters, sodium-independent
 – organic anion transport polypeptide c
 – organic anion transport protein 1
 – phosphate transport proteins
 – proton-phosphate symporters
 – sodium-phosphate cotransporter proteins
 – sodium-phosphate cotransporter proteins, type i
 – sodium-phosphate cotransporter proteins, type ii
 – sodium-phosphate cotransporter proteins, type iia
 – sodium-phosphate cotransporter proteins, type iib
 – sodium-phosphate cotransporter proteins, type iic
 – sodium-phosphate cotransporter proteins, type iii
 – antiporters
 – anion exchange protein 1, erythrocyte
 – chloride-bicarbonate antiporters
 – anion exchange protein 1, erythrocyte
 – potassium-hydrogen antiporters
 – sodium-calcium exchanger
 – sodium-hydrogen antiporter
 – vesicular neurotransmitter transport proteins
 – vesicular biogenic amine transport proteins
 – vesicular acetylcholine transport proteins
 – vesicular monoamine transport proteins
 – vesicular glutamate transport proteins
 – vesicular glutamate transport protein 1
 – vesicular glutamate transport protein 2
 – vesicular inhibitory amino acid transport proteins
 – cation transport proteins
 – ca(2+)-transporting atpase
 – na(+)-k(+)-exchanging atpase
 – organic cation transport proteins
 – organic cation transporter 1
 – proton pumps
 – bacteriorhodopsins
 – inorganic pyrophosphatase
 – electron transport complex i
 – electron transport complex iii
 – electron transport complex iv
 – photosystem i protein complex
 – proton-translocating atpases
 – bacterial proton-translocating atpases
 – chloroplast proton-translocating atpases
 – h(+)-k(+)-exchanging atpase
 – mitochondrial proton-translocating atpases
 – vacuolar proton-translocating atpases
 – symporters
 – dopamine plasma membrane transport proteins
 – gaba plasma membrane transport proteins
 – glutamate plasma membrane transport proteins
 – excitatory amino acid transporter 1
 – excitatory amino acid transporter 2
 – excitatory amino acid transporter 3
 – excitatory amino acid transporter 4
 – excitatory amino acid transporter 5
 – glycine plasma membrane transport proteins
 – norepinephrine plasma membrane transport proteins
 – proton-phosphate symporters
 – serotonin plasma membrane transport proteins
 – sodium chloride symporters
 – sodium-glucose transport proteins
 – sodium-glucose transporter 1
 – sodium-glucose transporter 2
 – sodium-bicarbonate symporters
 – sodium-phosphate cotransporter proteins
 – sodium-phosphate cotransporter proteins, type i
 – sodium-phosphate cotransporter proteins, type ii
 – sodium-phosphate cotransporter proteins, type iia
 – sodium-phosphate cotransporter proteins, type iib
 – sodium-phosphate cotransporter proteins, type iic
 – sodium-phosphate cotransporter proteins, type iii
 – sodium-potassium-chloride symporters

– monosaccharide transport proteins
 – glucose transport proteins, facilitative
 – glucose transporter type 1
 – glucose transporter type 2
 – glucose transporter type 3
 – glucose transporter type 4
 – glucose transporter type 5
 – sodium-glucose transport proteins
 – sodium-glucose transporter 1
 – sodium-glucose transporter 2

– neurotransmitter transport proteins
 – plasma membrane neurotransmitter transport proteins
 – catecholamine plasma membrane transport proteins
 – dopamine plasma membrane transport proteins
 – norepinephrine plasma membrane transport proteins
 – gaba plasma membrane transport proteins
 – glutamate plasma membrane transport proteins
 – excitatory amino acid transporter 1
 – excitatory amino acid transporter 2
 – excitatory amino acid transporter 3
 – excitatory amino acid transporter 4
 – excitatory amino acid transporter 5
 – glycine plasma membrane transport proteins
 – serotonin plasma membrane transport proteins
 – vesicular neurotransmitter transport proteins
 – vesicular biogenic amine transport proteins
 – vesicular acetylcholine transport proteins
 – vesicular monoamine transport proteins
 – vesicular glutamate transport proteins
 – vesicular glutamate transport protein 1
 – vesicular glutamate transport protein 2
 – vesicular inhibitory amino acid transport proteins

– nucleobase, nucleoside, nucleotide, and nucleic acid transport proteins
 – nucleobase transport proteins
 – nucleoside transport proteins
 – equilibrative nucleoside transport proteins
 – equilibrative nucleoside transporter 1
 – equilibrative-nucleoside transporter 2
 – nucleotide transport proteins
 – mitochondrial adp, atp translocases
 – adenine nucleotide translocator 1
 – adenine nucleotide translocator 2
 – adenine nucleotide translocator 3

– nucleocytoplasmic transport proteins
 – aryl hydrocarbon receptor nuclear translocator
 – cellular apoptosis susceptibility protein
 – karyopherins
 – alpha karyopherins
 – beta karyopherins
 – nuclear pore complex proteins
 – ran gtp-binding protein

– neurophysins

– periplasmic binding proteins

– phosphate-binding proteins

– phosphate transport proteins
 – proton-phosphate symporters
 – sodium-phosphate cotransporter proteins
 – sodium-phosphate cotransporter proteins, type i
 – sodium-phosphate cotransporter proteins, type ii
 – sodium-phosphate cotransporter proteins, type iia
 – sodium-phosphate cotransporter proteins, type iib
 – sodium-phosphate cotransporter proteins, type iic
 – sodium-phosphate cotransporter proteins, type iii

– phosphatidylethanolamine binding protein

– phospholipid transfer proteins

– retinol-binding proteins

– RNA-binding proteins

– butyrate response factor 1

– fragile x mental retardation protein

– hu paraneoplastic encephalomyelitis antigens

– mrna cleavage and polyadenylation factors
 – cleavage stimulation factor
 – cleavage and polyadenylation specificity factor

– host factor 1 protein

– iron regulatory protein 1

– iron regulatory protein 2

– nuclear factor 90 proteins
 – nuclear factor 45 protein

– poly(a)-binding proteins
 – poly(a)-binding protein i
 – poly(a)-binding protein ii

– polypyrimidine tract-binding protein

– ribonucleoproteins
 – heterogeneous-nuclear ribonucleoproteins
 – heterogeneous-nuclear ribonucleoprotein group a-b
 – heterogeneous-nuclear ribonucleoprotein group c
 – heterogeneous-nuclear ribonucleoprotein d
 – heterogeneous-nuclear ribonucleoprotein group f-h
 – heterogeneous-nuclear ribonucleoprotein k
 – heterogeneous-nuclear ribonucleoprotein l
 – heterogeneous-nuclear ribonucleoprotein group m
 – heterogeneous-nuclear ribonucleoprotein u
 – RNA-binding protein ews
 – RNA-binding protein fus
 – ribonuclease p
 – ribonucleoproteins, small cytoplasmic
 – signal recognition particle
 – ribonucleoproteins, small nuclear
 – ribonucleoproteins, small nucleolar
 – ribonucleoprotein, u1 small nuclear
 – ribonucleoprotein, u2 small nuclear
 – ribonucleoprotein, u4-u6 small nuclear
 – ribonucleoprotein, u5 small nuclear
 – ribonucleoprotein, u7 small nuclear
 – RNA-induced silencing complex
 – vault ribonucleoprotein particles

– rna cap-binding proteins
 – eukaryotic initiation factor-4e
 – nuclear cap-binding protein complex

– s-phase kinase-associated proteins

– sex hormone-binding globulin

– thyroxine-binding proteins

– transcobalamins

– transcortin

– transferrin-binding proteins

– receptors, transferrin
 – bacterial transferrin receptor complex
 – transferrin-binding protein a
 – transferrin-binding protein b

– vitamin d-binding protein

The list continues at List of MeSH codes (D12.776) § MeSH D12.776.167.

D12.776.157